CGS Petrel was a Canadian patrol vessel used primarily for fisheries protection on the upper Great Lakes from 1892 to 1904. In 1904, Petrel was sent to the East Coast of Canada for fisheries protection duties there. In 1912, Petrel was fitted for minesweeping and in 1914, was taken over by the Royal Canadian Navy for use as an examination vessel during the First World War. Following the war, Petrel was discarded.

Description
The vessel was powered by a compound steam engine driving one screw creating  (nominal). The ship was armed with one QF 12-pounder 12 cwt naval gun and three machine guns.

Service history
In 1888, a treaty to combat illegal fishing in Canadian waters between Canada and the United States was rejected by the United States Senate. Prime Minister Sir Charles Tupper then sought British Royal Navy aid in patrolling Canadian fisheries, but his request was rejected. The Canadian government then ordered the construction of three new armed patrol vessels. Petrel was constructed by Polson Iron Works Limited at their shipyard in Owen Sound, Ontario. The vessel entered service in 1892 patrolling the Great Lakes. Petrel was given directives to target illegal fishing by Americans in Canadian waters.

On 8 May 1894, the Canadian vessel intercepted a large group of American fishing vessels, arresting 50 fisherman and impounding their boats. In 1902, Petrel seized 998 nets from poachers. However, the ship was being outpaced by the American fishing vessels that it sought to catch. That year, a newer, faster vessel was requested. On 12 August 1903, Petrel fired upon an American fishing vessel, Silver Spray, that appeared to be fishing in Canadian waters, off Long Point, in Lake Erie. Silver Spray returned to Erie, Pennsylvania having been hit twenty times, but had escaped from the Canadian vessel.  

Petrel remained on the Great Lakes until 1904, when the ship proved to be too slow to catch up with American fishing vessels. The ship remained in this service until 1912, when Petrel was fitted for minesweeping. At the onset of the First World War, Petrel was among the vessels forced into patrol duty by the Royal Canadian Navy and was used to patrol the Grand Manan Channel. After the war's end in 1918, Petrel was discarded.

Notes

Citations

Sources
 
 
 
 

Canadian Government Ship
Fishery protection vessels
1892 ships